Lester Craig Hayes (born January 22, 1955) is an American former professional football player who was a cornerback for the Oakland / Los Angeles Raiders of the National Football League (NFL).

Hayes was commonly referred to as "the Judge" and also as "Lester the Molester" because of his bump and run coverage. He had a distinct stance, crouching very low when facing the opposing wide receiver. He was also known for using Stickum before it was banned in 1981 by a rule bearing his name. He had been introduced to it by Fred Biletnikoff, who unlike Hayes has made it to the Pro Football Hall of Fame; Hayes shares the all-time club record in interceptions with 39 with Willie Brown. Hayes and his thirteen interceptions in 1980 is tied for second most in a season all-time and the most in the last 40 seasons.

College career
In college starting in 1973 he played for the Texas A&M Aggies.  He first played defensive end as a freshman and then linebacker and safety as a sophomore. During his junior and senior years he settled in as a safety and became an All-American for his play at safety.

Professional career
Hayes was converted to cornerback after being chosen by the Raiders in the fifth round of the 1977 draft. Hayes helped contribute to the Raiders two Super Bowl wins in 1980 and 1983. Hayes was a one time All-Pro (1980) and a five-time Pro Bowler (1980–1984).
He was known as one of the greatest shutdown cornerbacks in NFL history. In 1980, Hayes led the NFL with 13 interceptions, tied for second most with Dan Sandifer, who had set it in 1948, and behind Dick "Night Train" Lane with 14 in 1952, and was named AP Defensive Player of the Year and the NEA Defensive Player of the Year.  He added five more interceptions in Oakland's three playoff games as they advanced to a victory in Super Bowl XV

A big Star Wars fan, during pregame interviews for Super Bowl XVIII he declared himself the "only true Jedi" in the NFL. His best performance was probably in Super Bowl XVIII.  He had only one tackle, but that was because he so effectively covered Charlie Brown and Art Monk that Joe Theismann hardly threw to the left side of the field. During his last four seasons, he formed a partnership with Mike Haynes that has been considered one of the best in league history.  Hayes and Haynes gave the Raiders the luxury of having two shutdown corners.  They are widely reckoned as being the prototypes for a generation of speedy and physical cornerbacks.

He retired after the 1986 season with a total of 39 interceptions (including 4 defensive touchdowns), a Raider record shared with Hall of Famer Willie Brown.

In 2012, the Professional Football Researchers Association named Hayes to the PFRA Hall of Very Good Class of 2012.

Stickum usage
Hayes was introduced to Stickum, an adhesive substance used by players to improve their grip, in his 1977 rookie season by Hall of Fame wide receiver and fellow teammate Fred Biletnikoff. However, instead of just applying a small amount to his hands, he began to slather it all over his arms and even his uniform, drawing more and more attention to it. Hayes would later describe the influence the adhesive had on his career, saying that before being introduced to it in his rookie year, he "couldn't catch a cold in Antarctica".

The use of Stickum was banned by the NFL after the 1980 season. In the six seasons that Hayes played following the banning of Stickum, he had 14 total interceptions, compared to his 25 that he had in his first four seasons. However, he was named to the Pro Bowl and selected as a second-team All-Pro four times after 1980.  Hayes would later state that alongside lingering thumb injuries, the Stickum ban contributed to a decline in his later career. Fred Biletnikoff and Jerry Rice each stated their usage of Stickum and made it to the Pro Football Hall of Fame while Hayes has not. He was a finalist four times (2001-2004) and a semi-finalist six times (2005-2010).

References

1955 births
Living people
African-American players of American football
American Conference Pro Bowl players
American football cornerbacks
American football safeties
Los Angeles Raiders players
Oakland Raiders players
Players of American football from Houston
Sportspeople from Modesto, California
Texas A&M Aggies football players
21st-century African-American people
20th-century African-American sportspeople
National Football League Defensive Player of the Year Award winners